{{DISPLAYTITLE:C7H10O}}
The molecular formula C7H10O (molar mass: 110.15 g/mol, exact mass: 110.0732 u) may refer to:

 Norcamphor
 Tetrahydrobenzaldehyde, or 1,2,3,6-Tetrahydrobenzaldehyde

Molecular formulas